The City of Chelsea was a local government area about  south of Melbourne, the state capital of Victoria, Australia, on the eastern side of Port Phillip.

History

Chelsea was originally part of the Shire of Dandenong, and was severed and incorporated as the Borough of Carrum in May 1920. It was proclaimed the City of Chelsea on 8 May 1929.

On 15 December 1994, the City of Chelsea was abolished, and along with the City of Mordialloc and parts of the Cities of Moorabbin, Oakleigh and Springvale, was merged into the newly created City of Kingston.

Council meetings were held at Chelsea Town Hall at 316 Station Street, Chelsea. It presently serves as a council service centre and library for the City of Kingston.

Wards

The City of Chelsea was subdivided into three wards, each electing three councillors:
 North Ward
 Centre Ward
 South Ward

Suburbs
 Aspendale
 Carrum
 Chelsea*
 Edithvale

* Council seat.

Population

* Estimate in the 1958 Victorian Year Book.

References

External links
 Victorian Places - Chelsea

Chelsea
City of Kingston (Victoria)
1994 disestablishments in Australia
1920 establishments in Australia